is a 1966 yakuza film  directed by Seijun Suzuki. The story follows Tetsuya Watari as the reformed yakuza hitman "Phoenix" Tetsu who is forced to roam Japan avoiding execution by rival gangs.

Plot
An old yakuza boss named Kurata decides to retire from his criminal activities and disbands his gang. His fiercely loyal enforcer, Tetsuya "Phoenix Tetsu" Hondo, finds himself unable to enjoy a life outside of organized crime. He is hounded by a rival gang after turning down a recruitment offer by its boss, Otsuka. Otsuka sees Kurata's retirement as an opportunity to seize his territory via a real estate scam, seeing Tetsu as a threat to his plans. Kurata is eventually forced to convince Tetsu to become a drifter.

Otsuka sends his hitman "Viper" Tatsuzo to kill Tetsu, who evades him and Otsuka's hit squad a number of times with help from a former Otsuka gang member named Kenji. Tetsu later reaches the establishment of Kurata's ally Umetani, who reveals that Kurata joined forces with Otsuka and placed a bounty on Tetsu's head. A betrayed Tetsu returns to Tokyo for a final confrontation with Otsuka, killing everyone but his former girlfriend Chiharu, and Kurata takes his own life to redeem himself. Tetsu rejects Chiharu's plea for her to accompany him on his travels, explaining that he has dedicated himself to the wanderer lifestyle and could not abandon it for another's company.

Cast
 Tetsuya Watari as Tetsuya "Phoenix Tetsu" Hondo
 Chieko Matsubara as Chiharu
 Hideaki Nitani as Kenji Aizawa
 Tamio Kawaji as Tatsuzo The Viper
 Tsuyoshi Yoshida as Keiichi
 Ryūji Kita as Kurata
 Hideaki Esumi as Otsuka
 Eiji Go as Tanaka

Production
Nikkatsu bosses had been warning Suzuki to tone down his bizarre visual style for years and drastically reduced Tokyo Drifter'''s budget in hopes of getting results. This had the opposite effect in that Suzuki and art director Takeo Kimura pushed themselves to new heights of surrealism and absurdity. The studio's next move was to impose the further restriction of filming in black and white on his next two films, which again Suzuki met with even greater bizarreness culminating in his dismissal for "incomprehensibility".

Because of budget limitations, Suzuki had to cut connecting shots out of many fights, leading to a need for more creative camera work.

Various shots of Tokyo were used to establish the setting as the then-contemporary post-1964 Japan. Suzuki drew inspiration from a wide variety of sources in making Tokyo Drifter, including the musical films of the 1950s, pop art, absurdist comedy, and surrealist film.

Themes
Suzuki displays common themes found in Yakuza films, particularly the theme of loyalty, in order to parody the message and presentation of traditional Yakuza films. He uses his depictions of Yakuza relationships to show the inherent weakness of the archetype, particularly the possible abuses of power that can arise from unquestioning allegiance. Further, the common theme of corporate corruption is also parodied through exaggeration when the main character becomes an expendable retainer. The conventions in the film further parody the conformity of theme and structure apparent in all Japanese film, but especially in Yakuza films of the time, particularly its excesses.

Style
The mise en scène of Tokyo Drifter is highly stylized. Film reviewer Nikolaos Vryzidis claims that the film crosses over into a number of different genres, but most resembles the avant-garde films occurring in the 1960s.

At times, the film draws a good deal of inspiration from westerns. The whistling of the main character Tetsu is reminiscent of cowboy heroes. Near the middle of the film, a large bar fight erupts; this scene is meant to directly parody western films, everyone in the saloon joins in the brawl against United States Navy sailors, and comical violence is used where no one is permanently injured, despite the large-scale violence of the scene.

The majority of the film takes place in Tokyo, but portrays the city in a highly stylized manner. The opening sequence consists of a mash of images from metropolitan Tokyo, meant to condense the feeling of the city into one sequence.

The film opens in stylized black and white, which becomes vibrant color in all subsequent scenes. This served to represent Tokyo post-1964 Summer Olympics.

Reception
Vryzidis claims that Suzuki's later films, once the studio gave him more freedom, never reached the same level of artistic quality as Tokyo Drifter, where the studio attempted to impose a large amount of control over the project. Tetsu, the main character of the film, has also been well received. One reviewer commented that he always looks "cool", even when he is not the toughest guy in the room.

Stephen Barber called the visualization in Tokyo Drifter'' "bizarre and individual". Douglass Pratt praised the film for its quirkiness and character. He further stated that the plot of the film does not matter so much as "the gorgeous Pop Art sets, the bizarre musical sequences, the confusing but ballistic action scenes and the film's gunbutt attitude."

Legacy
The film is considered ahead of its time, as it abandoned the themes of the Ninkyo eiga films popular at the time, and combines with themes from the later Jitsuroku eiga Yakuza films, which disavowed the romantic and nostalgic views of the Yakuza in favor of social criticism.

Home video
The Criterion Collection released the film outside Japan in DVD format in 1999.  Criterion also released a Blu-ray version in 2013.

Soundtrack

The film has a recurrent appearance of Tetsu's girlfriend as a lounge singer repeating several times her signature song throughout the film.

Tokyo Drifter 2: The Sea is Bright Red as the Color of Love

 is a 1966 Japanese crime film and sequel to Tokyo Drifter.

Tetsuya completed his prison term in Tokyo. He goes to Kochi to meet his big brother Hide.

Cast
 Tetsuya Watari as Fushicho no Tetsu (Tetsuya Hondō)
 Kazuko Tachibana as Setsuko Toda
 Chieko Matsubara as Sally Kayama
 Teruo Yoshida as Kenji Gōda
 Keisuke Noro as Matsu
 Ryōtarō Sugi as Kōji Sugi
 Mari Shiraki as Hiromi
 Goro Tarumi as Ace no Hide (Shinji Toda)
 Shōbun Inoue as Onijima
 Nobuo Kaneko as Segawa

Footnotes

References

External links
 .
 
 
Tokyo Drifter: Catch My Drift an essay by Howard Hampton at the Criterion Collection 
 Tokyo Drifter at the Japanese Movie Database .

1966 films
Japanese crime thriller films
1960s crime thriller films
Films directed by Seijun Suzuki
1960s Japanese-language films
Nikkatsu films
Yakuza films
Films set in Japan
Films shot in Japan
Films shot in Tokyo
1960s Japanese films